Alexander Morton (born 24 March 1945) is a Scottish actor.

Acting career
Glasgow-born Morton trained in London at the Central School of Speech and Drama from 1965 to 1968 and is well known for his roles in several leading drama series, such as Taggart, Second Sight, Between the Lines, Minder, and Casualty; movies such as Croupier and London to Brighton; and single dramas The One That Got Away (1996), Looking After Jo Jo (1998), and The Man-Eating Wolves of Gysinge (2005).

He is best known for playing the ghillie Golly Mackenzie in the BBC TV series Monarch of the Glen (2000–2005, appearing in all 64 episodes), and before that made regular appearances over the 1980s and 1990s as the evil Andy Semple in Scottish soap Take the High Road.  From 2012 to 2015, Morton played Criminal Billy Kennedy in Scottish soap opera River City. He appeared again as Billy Kennedy in the 20th anniversary episode of the show in 2022. 

Highlights of his stage career include his work with Raindog Theatre Company in the early 1990s.  He was a founder member, along with Robert Carlyle, Caroline Paterson and Stuart Davis and others.  Leading roles with Raindog included his Scots rendition of Shakespeare's Macbeth and R.P. McMurphy in One Flew Over the Cuckoo's Nest, both directed by Robert Carlyle.  Morton also worked regularly with theatre companies 7:84 and Borderline, and has appeared at the Traverse, the Lyceum, the Bush, the Royal Court, as well as appearing in pantomime, notably two years running at the Eden Court Theatre in Inverness with Andy Gray, and at Glasgow's King's Theatre.

In 2006, Morton played the Prince of Darkness in the BBC radio adaptation of Dracula (Voyage of the Demeter, 2006). He was also the first actor to play Detective Inspector John Rebus in the BBC Radio 4 adaptation of Ian Rankin's Rebus series of books.  He also provided voices for video games, including Heavenly Sword, Viking: Battle for Asgard and he played Zoltan Chivay in series 2 and 3 of The Witcher. He was the narrator on three albums by the Swiss Celtic / Melodic Death Metal band Eluveitie.

Personal life
Morton has been married three times, and has two children – Kerry (b. 1970) and Jamie (b. 1980) – from each of his first two marriages. His first wife was Pam Scotcher; his second was Denise; and his third is Jane, whom he met before filming for Monarch of the Glen got underway. She was his landlady while he was doing television work in London.

Film and television credits
1971: Get Carter (film) Hubert - directed by Mike Hodges
1971: Manipulators (TV) written and directed by Mike Hodges
1979: Play for Today (TV): Ploughman's Share - Dave
1980-1994: Take the High Road (TV) - Andy Semple
1981: Play for Today (TV): The Good Time Girls - Alec Park
1984: Minder (TV): Windows - Alex
1985: Taggart (TV): Dead Ringer - David Balfour
1986: Waiting for Elvis (TV) Ike Morrison - directed by Hal Duncan
1987: Extras (TV) - Frank Riley - directed by David Andrew
1987: Bookie (TV) - Ross
1989: Winners and Losers (TV) - Ross
1990: Silent Scream - Don Winters
1992: Rab C. Nesbitt (TV) - Police Inspector Mccrae
1992-1994: Firm Friends (TV) - D.I. Hogg
1993: Between the Lines (TV) - Superintendent Tyrell
1993: Taggart (TV): Death Benefits - John Fraser
1994: Jolly a Man for All Seasons - Police Sergeant Watson
1994: Crime Story - John McVicar
1994: The Tales of Para Handy - John Cruickshank
1996: Bad Boys - Dick
1996: The One that Got Away - Big Bob (credited as Sandy Morton)
1996: Nightlife (TV movie) - D.C.Dave
1997: Looking After Jo Jo - DS Alistair Wright
1997: Bombay Blue - Jack Grey
1997: Love Me Tender (TV) - Tommy
1998: Croupier (film) David Reynolds
1999-2000: Second Sight (TV) - DS Julian
1999: Life Support (TV) - Alan Carswell
2000-2005: Monarch of the Glen (TV) - Golly Mackenzie in all 64 episodes
2005: The Man-Eating Wolves of Gysinge (TV) - Malmberg Nilsson
2006: Casualty (TV)
2006: London to Brighton (film) - Duncan Allen
2007: Kitchen (TV) - Mr. Glasgow
2008: Casualty (TV)
2009: Valhalla Rising (film) - Chieftain Barde
2010: Taggart: (TV) The Rapture - James Hardie
2010: Luther (TV) - Bill Winingham
2012-2015: River City (TV) - Billy Kennedy
2013: Shetland (TV) - Joseph Wilson
2022: River City (TV) - Billy Kennedy

Selected theatre credits

Radio credits

References

External links
 
 
 Alexander Morton Radio appearances

Scottish male television actors
Scottish male radio actors
Scottish male soap opera actors
Scottish male stage actors
Scottish male film actors
Scottish male video game actors
1945 births
Living people
Alumni of the Royal Central School of Speech and Drama
Male actors from Glasgow